Bancroft is a town located on the York River in Hastings County in the Canadian province of Ontario. It was first settled in the 1850s by United Empire Loyalists and Irish immigrants. From the mid-1950s to about 1982, mining was the primary industry. A village until 1999, Bancroft then merged with Dungannon Township to form the Town of Bancroft. The population at the time of the 2016 Census was 3,881; the regional population is 40,000. There are 150,000 visitors to Bancroft, annually.

History 
By 1823, the government had purchased nearly two million acres of land from the Chippewa and Mississaga First Nations including a tract on the York River in Hastings County which had been established in 1792. The area was mapped in 1835 by explorer David Thompson.

The first family to build a cabin here, the Clarks in 1853, did so to take advantage of the fur trade.  Early settlers included James Cleak and Alfred Barker from England who arrived in 1855, settling on Quarry Lake. They got jobs in administration; Cleak opened a small store and  Barker became the first postmaster. Over the years the settlement grew quickly. In fact, there were 89 families by 1868. Lumber companies arrived to remove timber.

Some of the earliest settlers were United Empire Loyalists, but from 1856 to 1861, most were from Ireland, fleeing the problems caused by the Great Famine; many had farming experience and settled in the Township of Dungannon where the land was fertile. Most of the settlers were attracted to the area by the offer of free  parcels that had been advertised in Great Britain. Some of the residents also sold furs, obtained through trapping.

Several colonization roads were built to the settlement in the 1850s70s, opening up the lands along the way to further settlement. The Hastings Road ran north. It was joined at Bancroft by the Mississippi Road running northwest from Plevna in Frontenac County and the Monck Road running west from Atherley on Lake Couchiching. This made Bancroft (then still known as York Mills) a significant crossroads.

The settlement had various names over the first years, York Mills, York River and York Branch. When the post office opened in 1861, it was called York River. A grist mill opened in 1865, gold was discovered in 1866 and other minerals would be discovered later. The discovery of sodalite by Frank Dawson Adams in 1892 led to the opening of he Princess Sodalite Mine. The first church and two schools were built in 1870. In 1879, the name of the settlement was changed to Bancroft by Senator Billa Flint, after the maiden name of his wife Elizabeth Ann Clement Bancroft. Flint convinced tradesmen to move to the area, which helped to attract more settlers. A woollen mill began operating in 1884.

The Central Ontario Railway arrived in 1900. In 1903, the Irondale, Bancroft and Ottawa Railway connected to the COR north of town at what is now Y Road, referring to the wye junction joining the two lines. They were beneficial in transporting settlers and goods; the railway would operate until 1982. Bancroft was incorporated as a village in December 1904. The first telephone in the village was at the railway station; it was connected in 1905. Electricity was not available until 1930.

Uranium was discovered in 1949 and construction of Faraday Mine started in 1952. The Red Cross Hospital opened in 1949. Faraday Mine was later renamed Madawaska Mine and operated until 1982. Other minerals were also mined over the years. The closing of the mine caused some economic hardship.

The Ontario Municipal Board approved a request for Bancroft village to become a town on August 9, 1995, with Bancroft Council bylaw 649-95 confirming the new status on 28 August 1995. In 1999, Bancroft merged with Dungannon Township to form the Town of Bancroft.

As of the October 2018 municipal election, the current Mayor is Paul Jenkins.

Demographics 
In 1931 the population was 911 people, growing significantly when the uranium mines opened.

Prior to amalgamation (1999):
 Total Population in 1996: 4,080
 Bancroft (village): 2,554
 Dungannon (township): 1,526
 Population in 1991:
 Bancroft (village): 2,383
 Dungannon (township): 1,412

Mother tongue:
 English as first language: 96.4%
 French as first language: 0.8%
 English and French as first language: 0.3%
 Other as first language: 2.5%

Housing 
In 2021, Bancroft was ranked as the best place in Canada to buy real estate by MoneySense.

Camping and hiking

Silent Lake Provincial Park 
Nearby south on Highway 28 provides local camping opportunities. American sportsmen fished and hunted on this private lake for 40 years before it became a park. Silent Lake has a rocky and undeveloped shoreline, a mixed forest and marshes full of birds and wildlife best seen by canoe. A rugged trail circles the lake, and sections of groomed ski trails have been graded for mountain biking.

Algonquin Provincial Park 
About an hour away on Highway 62 N - Highway 127 N - Highway 60 W, provides camping and hiking opportunities, beautiful forest and outdoor scenery. Portaging is quite common in this park. Algonquin offers many visitor attractions. Like Silent Lake, Algonquin has a rocky, treed and extensive undeveloped shoreline, a mixed forest and marshes full of birds and wildlife best seen by canoe. The OFSC trails through the park provide easy winter access by snowmobile.

One of the most common sights is the Canadian Moose.

Egan Chutes Provincial Park 
Located 15 km east of Bancroft on highway 28. Egan Chutes Provincial Park is a nature reserve. The park is home to many local plants including Poplar, White Birch, Ash, Buffalo Berry, and Purple Flowering Raspberry. You can also find many different minerals including Nepheline, Blue Corundum, Zircon, Biotite, and Sodalite. Collecting of rocks and minerals are prohibited in the park. It is about a 10 to 20 minute hike. You can drive for the first 100m until you reach a parking lot, the access road is paved for another 200m. The rest of the hike is done on a dirt road, continue walking for another 10 to 15 minutes and you will come to a clearing where you will be standing at the top of the main waterfall - Egan Chute.

Eagle's Nest Park 
It is a scenic lookout in the town of Bancroft, Ontario. It is built on the top of a sheer rock face and overlooks the northern portions of the town, the York River and Bancroft Airport. It features the Hawkwatch Trail, capped by a large wooden platform that provides views out over the town. The trail passes the footings of a former fire watchtower.

Arts and events 

In 2004, Bancroft won TVOntario's "Most Talented Town in Ontario" contest. A large number of artists and artisans live in the surrounding area, and exhibit together in events like the "Fall Studio Tour".

The Art Gallery of Bancroft hosts 11-12 exhibitions per year celebrating the work of local and regional artists and artisans. These exhibitions include the popular annual "Juried Show" and the annual student show displaying the work of four regional high schools. The gallery gift shop displays the paintings and fine crafts of area artists and the AGB boasts a permanent collection including some of Ontario's finest artists.

A Place For the Arts is an artist's cooperative and art gallery located in the town centre.

The town is home to the Village Playhouse, a theatre which has been hosting sold out plays, musicals and concerts since the early 1990s. Formerly the Bancroft Community Hall, the historical building was once the local jail, court house and library.

The annual Bancroft Rockbound Gemboree occurs in July and August.

Transportation 

Bancroft lies at the intersection of two provincial highways, Highway 28 and Highway 62, with several other inroads allowing access to the city.

Bancroft is served by the Jack Brown Airport, a Transport Canada Registered Aerodrome (CNW3), with a  crushed gravel runway, located immediately adjoining the town. A small airport, it was named after the man who was reeve at the time and instrumental in its construction.  Currently operated by the Bancroft Flying Club, the Jack Brown Airport is freely available to the general public and frequently referred to as The Bancroft Airport. Due to high terrain near both ends of the runway, pilots typically use a non-standard circuit, following the York River valley through the town for departing from runway 12 or landing on runway 30.

The Central Ontario Railway arrived in November 1900, connecting Bancroft with Trenton. The railway went through the Musclow-Greenview road and extended behind Birds Creek through a back trail (which is now used for cyclists and four wheeling) and continued through the town eventually going further away from the town at the 'Y' road division. The line was closed in 1975 and subsequently removed. The Bancroft, Irondale and Ottawa Railway connected Bancroft with Kinmount, Ontario. The line was purchased by the Canadian Northern Ontario Railway which became part of the Canadian National Railways in 1918. The line was abandoned in 1960.

The old train station in Bancroft served as the Chamber of Commerce and Mineral Museum until it was condemned in 2008. The Chamber, Mineral Museum, and Art Gallery relocated to other sites in the town. In 2011, the old station was moved onto a new foundation; it is now restored with an addition at the southern end of the building to house the Bancroft Gem and Mineral Club's museum and a caboose, which is not currently in use.

Media

Print
Bancroft Times, an independently-owned weekly (5,000 copies, paid circulation) founded 1894.
Bancroft This Week
North Hastings Advertiser

Radio

 FM 97.7 - CHMS-FM ("Moose FM"), hot adult contemporary
 FM 99.3 - CBLA-FM-5, (formerly AM 600 CBLV) CBC Radio One; rebroadcaster of CBLA-FM Toronto
 FM 103.5 - CKJJ-FM-4 (UCB Canada), Christian Music; rebroadcaster of CKJJ-FM Belleville

Television
Channel 2: CIII-TV-2 (Global) - analogue rebroadcaster of CIII-DT Toronto
Channel 4: CHEX-TV-1 (Global) - analogue rebroadcaster of CHEX-DT Peterborough

Climate

Notable people

 Clay Ives, Olympic bronze medalist in luge
 Ed Robertson, singer and songwriter for Barenaked Ladies, owns a cottage in the Bancroft area
 Cathy Sherk, golfer. Winner of the 1977 Canadian Women's Amateur  and 1978 U.S. Women's Amateur
 Arthur H. Shore, uranium mine owner
 Bryan Watson, former NHL defenseman
 Father Henry Maloney, priest
 Oscar Peterson, Jazz Pianist, owned a cottage on Baptiste Lake near Bancroft

See also
 List of communities in Ontario
List of townships in Ontario
 Uranium mining in the Bancroft area

References

External links

Towns in Ontario
Lower-tier municipalities in Ontario
Municipalities in Hastings County